Hydnum albomagnum, commonly known as the giant hedgehog, is a species of fungus in the family Hydnaceae native to North and Central America.

References 

Fungi described in 1901
Fungi of North America
albomagnum